Hongzhi was the era name of the Chinese Ming dynasty.

Hongzhi may also refer to:
Hongzhi Emperor, the tenth emperor of the Chinese Ming dynasty
Hongzhi Zhengjue (1091-1157), Chinese Chan Buddhist monk
Li Hongzhi (born , Chinese religious leader
Liang Hongzhi (1882–1946), Chinese politician
Gao Hongzhi (born 1967), Chinese politician 
Sun Hongzhi (born 1965), Chinese politician
Xu Hongzhi (born 1996), Chinese short track speed skater
Fu Hongzhi, Chinese paralympic archer